Empire Jazz is an album by bassist Ron Carter featuring jazz interpretations of five of John Williams' themes from The Empire Strikes Back which was recorded in 1980 and released on the RSO label.

Reception

The AllMusic review by Scott Yanow stated "the all-star group has plenty of solo space and the music is transformed into reasonably creative jazz".

Track listing
All compositions by John Williams.
 "The Imperial March (Darth Vader's Theme)" – 8:33
 "The Asteroid Field" – 9:08
 "Han Solo and the Princess (Love Theme)" – 8:09
 "Lando's Palace" – 7:04
 "Yoda's Theme" – 5:25

Personnel
Ron Carter – bass, arranger
Jon Faddis, Joe Shepley – trumpet, flugelhorn
Eddie Bert – trombone
Hubert Laws – flute
Frank Wess – tenor saxophone, soprano saxophone
Bob James – piano
Jay Berliner – electric guitar, acoustic guitar
Billy Cobham - drums
Ralph MacDonald – percussion
Album cover Artwork:  Jeff Wack

References

RSO Records albums
Ron Carter albums
1980 albums
The Empire Strikes Back
Music of Star Wars